Windows on the World was a complex of dining, meeting, and entertainment venues on the top floors (106th and 107th) of the North Tower (Building One) of the original World Trade Center complex in Lower Manhattan.

It included a restaurant called Windows on the World, a smaller restaurant called Wild Blue (before 1999 was called "Cellar in the Sky"), a bar called The Greatest Bar on Earth (which had previously been the Hors d'Oeuvrerie) as well as a wine school and conference and banquet rooms for private functions located on the 106th floor. Developed by restaurateur Joe Baum and designed initially by Warren Platner, Windows on the World occupied 50,000 square feet (4,600 m2) of space in the North Tower. The Skydive Restaurant, which was a 180 seat cafeteria on the 44th floor of 1 WTC conceived for office workers, was also operated by Windows on the World.

The restaurants opened on April 12, 1976, and were destroyed in the September 11 attacks. All of the staff members who were present in the restaurant on the day of the attacks perished.

Operations

The main dining room faced north and east, allowing guests to look out onto the skyline of Manhattan. The dress code required jackets for men and was strictly enforced; a man who arrived with a reservation but without a jacket was seated at the bar. The restaurant offered jackets that were loaned to the patrons so they could eat in the main dining room. The dinnerware, rugs, lighting fixtures, menus and the communication equipment were designed by Milton Glaser.

A more intimate dining room, Wild Blue, was located on the south side of the restaurant. The bar extended along the south side of 1 World Trade Center as well as the corner over part of the east side. Looking out from the bar through the full length windows, one could see views of the southern tip of Manhattan, where the Hudson and East Rivers meet. In addition, one could see the Liberty State Park with Ellis Island and Staten Island with the Verrazzano-Narrows Bridge. The kitchens, utility spaces, and conference center in the restaurant were located on the 106th floor. 

Windows on the World closed after the 1993 bombing, in which employee Wilfredo Mercado was killed while checking in deliveries in the building's underground garage. The explosion also damaged receiving areas, storage and parking spots used by the restaurant complex. On May 12, 1994, the Port Authority of New York and New Jersey announced that the Joseph Baum & Michael Whiteman Company had won the contract to run the restaurants after Windows's former operator, Inhilco, gave up its lease. It underwent a US$25 million renovation and reopened in June 26, 1996. Cellar in the Sky, which was a different space within the restaurant (it could only seat 60 people), reopened after Labor Day. In 1999, Cellar in the Sky was changed into an American steakhouse and renamed "Wild Blue". In 2000, its final full year of operation, it reported revenues of US$37 million, making it the highest-grossing restaurant in the United States.

The executive chefs of Windows on the World included Philippe Feret of Brasserie Julien while the last chef was Michael Lomonaco.

September 11 attacks

Windows on the World was destroyed when the North Tower collapsed during the terrorist attacks of September 11, 2001 when the restaurant was hosting regular breakfast patrons and the Risk Waters Financial Technology Congress. World Trade Center lessor, Larry Silverstein, was regularly holding breakfast meetings in Windows on the World with tenants as part of his recent acquisition of the Twin Towers from the Port Authority, and was scheduled to be in the restaurant on the morning of the attacks. However, his wife insisted that he had to go to a dermatologist's appointment that morning, whereby he avoided death. Everyone present in the restaurant when American Airlines Flight 11 crashed into the North Tower at 8:46a.m. died that day, as all means of escape (including the stairwells and elevators leading down from the impact zones) were instantly severed by the impact. Victims trapped in Windows on the World either died from smoke inhalation, burning in the fires, or being killed in the eventual collapse of the North Tower 102 minutes later. At least five Windows occupants were witnessed jumping or falling to their deaths from the restaurant.

There were 72 restaurant staff present in the restaurant, including assistant general manager Christine Olender, whose desperate calls to Port Authority police represented the restaurant's final communications. Sixteen Incisive Media-Risk Waters Group employees, as well as 76 other guests/contractors, were also present. Among those also present was the executive director of the Port Authority, Neil Levin, who was having breakfast. After about 9:40a.m., no further distress calls from the restaurant were made. The last people to leave the restaurant before Flight 11 crashed into the North Tower at 8:46a.m. were Michael Nestor, Liz Thompson, Geoffrey Wharton, and Richard Tierney. They departed at 8:44a.m. and survived the attack.

Critical review 
In its last iteration, Windows on the World received mixed reviews. Ruth Reichl, a New York Times food critic, said in December 1996 that "nobody will ever go to Windows on the World just to eat, but even the fussiest food person can now be content dining at one of New York's favorite tourist destinations." She gave the restaurant two out of four stars, signifying a "very good" quality rather than "excellent" (three stars) or "extraordinary" (four stars). In his 2009 book Appetite, William Grimes wrote that "At Windows, New York was the main course." In 2014, Ryan Sutton of Eater.com compared the now-destroyed restaurant's cuisine to that of its replacement, One World Observatory. He stated, "Windows helped usher in a new era of captive audience dining in that the restaurant was a destination in itself, rather than a lazy byproduct of the vital institution it resided in."

Cultural impact and legacy

Windows of Hope Family Relief Fund was organized soon after the attacks to provide support and services to the families of those in the food, beverage, and hospitality industries who had been killed on September 11 in the World Trade Center. Windows on the World executive chef Michael Lomonaco and owner-operator David Emil were among the founders of that fund.

It has been speculated that The Falling Man, a famous photograph of a man dressed in white falling headfirst on September 11, was an employee at Windows on the World. Although his identity has never been conclusively established, he was believed to be Jonathan Briley, an audio technician at the restaurant.

On March 30, 2005, the novel Windows on the World, by French novelist Frédéric Beigbeder, was released. The novel focuses on two brothers, aged seven and nine years, who are in the restaurant with their dad Carthew Yorsten. The novel starts at 8:29a.m. (just before the plane hits the tower) and tells about every event on every following minute, ending at 10:30a.m., just after the collapse. Published in 2012, Kenneth Womack's novel The Restaurant at the End of the World offers a fictive recreation of the lives of the staff and visitors at the Windows on the World complex on the morning of September 11.

On January 4, 2006, a number of former Windows on the World staff opened Colors, a co-operative restaurant in Manhattan that serves as a tribute to their colleagues and whose menu reflects the diversity of the former Windows' staff. That original restaurant closed, but its founders' umbrella organization, Restaurant Opportunities Centers United, continues its mission, including at Colors restaurants in New York and other cities.

Windows on the World was planned to reopen on the top floors of the new One World Trade Center, when the tower was complete. However, on March 7, 2011, it was cancelled because of cost concerns and other troubles finding support for the project. Instead, One World Observatory contains eateries named ONE Dine, ONE Mix and ONE Café.

See also

List of tenants in 1 World Trade Center
Top of the World Trade Center Observatories

References

External links

Windows on the World (Archive)
Archived snapshot of the former WotW website, August 2, 2002
Last pre-9/11 archived snapshot of the former WotW website, February 1, 2001
Photographs of WotW

1976 establishments in New York City
2001 disestablishments in New York (state)
Defunct restaurants in New York City
Defunct tourist attractions in the United States
Restaurants disestablished in 2001
Restaurants established in 1976
September 11 attacks
Restaurants in Manhattan
World Trade Center